Pettinger is a surname. Notable people with the surname include:

Andy Pettinger (born 1984), English footballer
Billy Pettinger (born 1982), Canadian singer and songwriter
Donald R. Pettinger (born 1961), American jockey
Eric Pettinger (1904–1968), Canadian ice hockey player, brother of Gord
Glenn Pettinger (born 1928), Canadian basketball player
Gord Pettinger (1911–1986), Canadian ice hockey player
Matt Pettinger (born 1980), Canadian ice hockey player
Paul Pettinger (born 1975), English footballer
Rosi Pettinger (born 1933), German figure skater
Tejvan Pettinger (born 1976), English cyclist

See also
Pottinger (disambiguation)